CFS Senneterre, initially called RCAF Station Senneterre prior to 1967, was a long-range radar and Ground Control Intercept station, part of the Pinetree Line radar defence network, situated  north of Val-d'Or, Quebec.  Situated atop Mount Bell, east of the town of Senneterre, Quebec, construction started in 1950.  By 1953 the 34 AC&W Squadron became operational. From 1968 to 1973 Senneterre was the backup to CFB North Bay, the regional command post; in the event it was incapacitated by a nuclear strike, Senneterre was designated an Alternative Command Post (ALCOP). In 1988 the station was deemed no longer necessary as a long-range radar, and closed.

Post closure 
After closure in 1988 some of the facilities were sold to private interests. At the operations site:
 Telebec purchased the southmost radar building and erected a cell phone tower .
 The height finder building  has been demolished for unknown reasons.
 The operations building  was demolished after a fire in the early 1990s.
 The SAGE Annex  is intact and privately owned.  
 The northmost standing radar building  is intact and privately owned.
 The TX and RX communications buildings have been repurposed by a local firearms club as indoor target ranges.

References 

Sennet
Senneterre
Military history of Canada